Sitona hispidulus is a species of weevil native to Europe. Invasive to Asia and North America.

References

Externalalso found in asia and north america links
Images representing Sitona  at BOLD

Curculionidae
Beetles described in 1777
Beetles of Europe